Group A of the 2014 Fed Cup Europe/Africa Zone Group II was one of two pools in the Europe/Africa zone of the 2014 Fed Cup. Four teams competed in a round robin competition, with the top team and the bottom team proceeding to their respective sections of the play-offs: the top team played for advancement to Group I, while the bottom team faced potential relegation to Group III.

Standings

Round-robin

Finland vs. Lithuania

Montenegro vs. Liechtenstein

Finland vs. Montenegro

Lithuania vs. Liechtenstein

Finland vs. Liechtenstein

Lithuania vs. Montenegro

References

External links 
 Fed Cup website

A2